How Angel Peterson Got His Name is a nonfiction, young adult memoir written by Gary Paulsen, outlining the experiences of Paulsen and his friends during the mid-1950s.

The book includes discussions of hang gliding and bike riding.

References 

2003 non-fiction books
American memoirs
Young adult non-fiction books
Books by Gary Paulsen
Wendy Lamb Books books